José Luis Gil Sanz (born 9 December 1957) is a Spanish actor.

Biography
He started his career when he was ten years old. His most popular roles are Juan Cuesta in the TV series Aquí no hay quien viva and Enrique Pastor in La que se avecina, but he has worked as a voice actor since the 1970s.

He dubbed Tim Allen in the TV series Last Man Standing (2011–2017). In 2013 Carmen Ruiz and José Luis Gil were awarded by the Premio Talento de Comedia del Festival de Cine de Comedia de Tarazona y Moncayo.

On 4 November 2021 he suffered an ischemic stroke that was announced on 1 December 2021, and was hospitalized until 24 of November. As of September 2022, he is still in recovery and not able to work.

Filmography (movies)

As an actor 
 2009 - Brain Drain
 2009 – Fuga de cerebros
 2002 – En la ciudad sin límites
 1999 – Lisboa
 1996 – Teresa y Vanessa
 1994 – Todo es mentira
 1991 – Cómo levantar 1000 kilos

As a voiceover actor 
 2007 Donkey Xote
 2005
 El sueño de una noche de San Juan
 Valiant
 2003 – Finding Nemo
 2002 – Peter Pan. Regreso al país de Nunca Jamás
 2000 – Buzz Lightyear: La película
 1999
 Runaway Bride
 Tarzán
 Toy Story 2
 1998 – The Big Lebowski
 1997 – Volcano
 1996
 Independence Day
 Showgirls
 1995
 Braveheart
 Nueve meses
 Toy Story
 1994 – Ace Ventura: A Pet Detective
 1994 - The Crow
 1996 – James and the Giant Peach
 1988 – Who Framed Roger Rabbit
 1987 – Dirty Dancing
 1983 – The Outsiders
 1979 – The Life of Brian

Filmography (TV-series)

As an actor 
 2007 – La que se avecina
 2003–2006 Aquí no hay quien viva
 2001
 Agente 700
 El comisario
 1998 – Fernández y familia

As a voiceover actor 

 2000 – Buzz Lightyear: Guardianes del espacio
 1995 – The X-Files
 1989 – I, Claudius
 1983 – Fraggle Rock
 1981 – Dogtanian and the Three Muskehounds

References

External links

Ficha de doblaje

1957 births
Living people
Spanish male film actors
Spanish male stage actors
Spanish male television actors
Spanish male voice actors
Spanish voice directors